Valuwa is sometimes used as an alternative name for:

 Aplow, a village and associated district of Vanuatu
 Volow, an extinct communalect previously spoken in the same area.
 the small airstrip of Motalava island, also known as Valua or Valuwa airport, located close to the village of Aplow.